Mill Creek is a tributary of Neshaminy Creek, one of three tributaries of the Neshaminy which all share the same name, and one of six in Bucks County, Pennsylvania which share the name.
The Geographic Name Information System I.D. is 1181118, U.S. Department of the Interior Geological Survey I.D. is 02596.

Course
Mill Creek begins with the confluence of Watson Creek and Lahaska Creek in the central portion of Buckingham Township a short distance south-southeast of the village of Buckingham, flows generally southeast for almost  to the southwest of Buckingham Mountain where it turns to the east.

Geology
Appalachian Highlands Division
Piedmont Province
Gettysburg-Newark Lowland Section
Leithsville Formation
Brunswick Formation
Allentown Formation
Lockatong Formation
At Mill Creek's headwaters, at the confluence of Lahaska Creek and Watson Creek, is the Allentown Formation, a sedimentary layer of rock deposited during the Cambrian. Mineralogy includes dolomite, limestone, chert, siltstone, oolite, stromatolites, and sharpstone conglomerate.

After a very short distance, it flows into the Leithsville Formation, a sedimentary layer also deposited during the Cambrian. Mineralogy includes dolomite, some containing sand or shale, calcareous shale, and chert.

It then flows into the Brunswick Formation, a sedimentary layer laid down during the Jurassic and Triassic. Mineralogy includes shale, mudstone, siltstone, green and brown shale.

Shortly before it reaches the Neshaminy, it flows into the Lockatong Formation, another formation of sedimentary rock. Mineralogy includes a dark-gray to black argillite, some zones of black shale, and some limestone and calcareous shale.

Named Tributaries
Robin Run
Watson Creek
Lahaska Creek

Municipalities
Wrightstown Township
Buckingham Township

Crossings and Bridges

See also
List of rivers of Pennsylvania
List of rivers of the United States
List of Delaware River tributaries

References

Rivers of Pennsylvania
Rivers of Bucks County, Pennsylvania
Tributaries of the Neshaminy Creek